The Trevor Law Group was a three-member Beverly Hills law firm notable in California and nationally for their heavy-handed tort law abuse. In 2002, it was alleged that they engaged in a form of extortion by threatening to sue thousands of businesses for violating a now defunct provision of the Business & Professions Code, then offering to "settle" for a few thousand dollars apiece. The investigation was the largest in the history of the State Bar of California, and three principals of the firm were recommended for disbarment. They eventually gave up being lawyers.

The Trevor lawyers appear to have gone further than many other law firms accused of similar abuses. The Group is now often cited in discussions of tort law abuse.

References

External links

Law firms based in Los Angeles
Defunct law firms of the United States
Law firms with year of establishment missing
Law firms with year of disestablishment missing